Ognev (feminine: Ogneva) is a Russian surname. Notable people with the surname include:

 Sergey Ognev (1886–1951), Russian zoologist and naturalist
 Yaroslav Ognev (born 1969), Russian Internet personality

Russian-language surnames